Keith Akira Kogane, known as  in the original Japanese language Beast King GoLion, is a fictional character in the media franchise Voltron and leader of the Voltron Force, who made his debut appearance in Defender of the Universe.

Voltron: Defender of the Universe

Keith becomes the leader of the Voltron Force after escaping Planet Doom.

Voltron Force

Keith Kogane became a fugitive by the Galaxy Alliance after Voltron was decommissioned. He eventually retires as Black Paladin to marry Allura and become her king consort.

Voltron: Legendary Defender

At the start of Voltron: Legendary Defender, Keith was a dropout from the Galaxy Garrison, despite being considered the most talented pilot of his generation. After finding Shiro on Earth along with Lance , Hunk, and Pidge, he joins Voltron as the Paladin of the Red Lion to fight against the Galra Empire. When Shiro disappears at the end of Season 2, Keith reluctantly takes over as paladin of the Black Lion and leader of Voltron. He has Galran ancestry through his mother, a member of the rebel faction called Blade of Marmora. Later in the series, Keith joins the Blade of Mamora to better understand his Galran half and so Shiro can return as the Black Paladin and leader of Voltron. When it turns out Shiro is a clone under Haggar's control, Keith returns as the Black Paladin.

Conception
In Voltron: Legendary Defender, Keith is not initially the leader of the Voltron Force. The character receives a lot of character growth as the seasons progress.

Comics

In the 2011 Devil's Due comics, the Keith character is referred to as Keith Akira Kogane. The comic book version of Keith depicts him as 26 and a very asocial character in the beginning. Born in Hong Kong to a Japanese father and a Chinese mother, his father trained him in kung fu until Keith's parents died tragically in an accident when he was 12. Afterwards, Keith continued to practice many other forms of martial arts until he turned 18 and enrolled in the United States Marine Corps, spending several years as a reconnaissance specialist. When he was 24, he met and proposed to Beverly Hagel, who died 7 weeks before their wedding date in a plane accident. Two years later, he was approached by Colonel Hawkins to join a team of outcasts to search for the legendary robot Voltron on the distant planet Arus. During the course of the series, he begins to form a comradeship with his teammates, and begins to develop feelings for Princess Allura and vice versa.

Reception
Keith has a mostly positive reception from critics.

References

Television characters introduced in 1984
Fictional Asian-American people
Fictional martial arts trainers
Voltron
Fictional military personnel
Fictional Chinese people
Fictional Japanese people